Jean Audoubert (7 April 1924 – 21 June 2008) was a French rugby league player who represented France in the 1951 tour of Australia and New Zealand and the 1954 Rugby League World Cup. He was nicknamed Monseigneur.

References

1924 births
2008 deaths
France national rugby league team players
French rugby league players
Lyon Villeurbanne XIII players
Rugby league hookers
Sportspeople from Ariège (department)
Toulouse Olympique players